Virmani is an Indian ([[khatri) surname. Notable people with the surname include:

Arundhati Virmani (born 1957), Indian historian
Arvind Virmani (born 1949), Indian economist
Shabnam Virmani, Indian film director
Raju Virmani, Punjabi and Hindi Bhajan Singer

Indian surnames
Surnames of Indian origin
Punjabi-language surnames
Hindu surnames
Khatri clans
Khatri surnames